Three Wells Fargo Center is a  high rise in Charlotte, North Carolina.

History

Prior to the First Union-Wachovia merger, this building was called Three First Union Center. In December 2010, as a result of Wells Fargo's 2008 purchase of Wachovia, the building was renamed from Three Wachovia Center to Three Wells Fargo Center.

Museum
A branch of the Wells Fargo History Museum was located in the building, until all but one of the bank's thirteen museums were closed to align with corporate strategy. The museum's exhibits included gold mining in North Carolina, a 19th-century stagecoach, and a model of an 1889 Wachovia Bank branch from Winston-Salem.

See also
List of tallest buildings in Charlotte
List of tallest buildings in North Carolina
One Wells Fargo Center
Two Wells Fargo Center

References

External links

Emporis
Skyscraperpage

Skyscraper office buildings in Charlotte, North Carolina
Office buildings completed in 2000
Wells Fargo buildings